The canton of Matha is an administrative division of the Charente-Maritime department, western France. Its borders were modified at the French canton reorganisation which came into effect in March 2015. Its seat is in Matha.

It consists of the following communes:

Antezant-la-Chapelle
Asnières-la-Giraud
Aulnay
Bagnizeau
Ballans
Bazauges
Beauvais-sur-Matha
Blanzac-lès-Matha
Blanzay-sur-Boutonne
Bresdon
Brie-sous-Matha
La Brousse
Cherbonnières
Chives
Coivert
Contré
Courcelles
Courcerac
Cressé 
Dampierre-sur-Boutonne
Les Éduts
Les Églises-d'Argenteuil
Fontaine-Chalendray
Fontenet
Gibourne
Le Gicq
Gourvillette
Haimps
Loiré-sur-Nie
Louzignac
Macqueville
Massac
Matha
Mons
Néré
Neuvicq-le-Château
Nuaillé-sur-Boutonne
Paillé
Poursay-Garnaud
Prignac
Romazières
Saint-Georges-de-Longuepierre
Saint-Julien-de-l'Escap
Saint-Mandé-sur-Brédoire
Saint-Martial
Saint-Martin-de-Juillers
Saint-Ouen-la-Thène
Saint-Pardoult
Saint-Pierre-de-Juillers
Saint-Pierre-de-l'Isle
Saint-Séverin-sur-Boutonne
Saleignes
Seigné
Siecq
Sonnac
Thors
Les Touches-de-Périgny
Varaize
Vervant
La Villedieu
Villemorin
Villiers-Couture
Vinax

References

Cantons of Charente-Maritime